Helder Lobato Ribeiro (born 18 July 1988), sometimes known as just Helder, is a Brazilian professional footballer who captains plays as a defender for TRAU in the I-League.

Honours
Al-Wehdat
 Jordan League: 2015–16
TRAU
I-League third place: 2020–21

References

External links
 Futebol de Goyaz profile 
 

1987 births
Living people
Sportspeople from Belém
Brazilian footballers
Association football defenders
Clube Atlético Patrocinense players
Al-Wehdat SC players
Borneo F.C. players
Burgan SC players
Al-Shabab SC (Kuwait) players
TRAU FC players
Campeonato Brasileiro Série D players
Liga 1 (Indonesia) players
Brazilian expatriate footballers
Brazilian expatriate sportspeople in Jordan
Brazilian expatriate sportspeople in Indonesia
Brazilian expatriate sportspeople in Kuwait
Expatriate footballers in Jordan
Expatriate footballers in Indonesia
Expatriate footballers in Kuwait
Kuwait Premier League players